2016 FC Ryukyu season.

Squad
As of 29 May 2016.

J3 League

References

External links
 J.League official site

FC Ryukyu
FC Ryukyu seasons